Amegilla zonata is a species of blue-banded bees belonging to the family Apidae, widely distributed in Southeast Asia, where it is often confused with the Australian species Amegilla cingulata.

References

External links
 http://taxo4254.wikispaces.com/Amegilla+zonata
 https://www.academia.edu/7390502/AN_UPDATED_CHECKLIST_OF_BEES_OF_SRI_LANKA_WITH_NEW_RECORDS
 http://animaldiversity.org/accounts/Amegilla_zonata/classification/#Amegilla_zonata
 http://vespa-bicolor.net/main/solitary-bees/amegilla.htm

Apinae
Bees described in 1758
Taxa named by Carl Linnaeus